Milosevic on Trial, also known as Slobodan Milosevic – Præsident under Anklage (the Danish title), is a documentary by Danish director Michael Christoffersen that follows the trial of Slobodan Milošević from 2002 until his death in 2006. The documentary has won several awards, and has been in competition at the 2008 Tribeca Film Festival, at Hot Docs '08, and at the 6th Silverdocs festival in Washington DC. The showing at Silverdocs was followed by a panel discussion with former NATO Supreme Allied Commander Europe, Wesley Clark.

Awards 
2008: Grand Prix Award, 23rd Odense International Film Festival
2008: Robert Award for Best Long Documentary
2007: EBU Golden Link award
2007: GuldDok for Best Production

Notes and references

External links 

Epic Sound – official website for Simon Ravn, who composed the music for Milosevic on Trial

2007 television films
2007 films
Danish documentary films
2007 documentary films
Serbian-language films
Slobodan Milošević
Cultural depictions of Slobodan Milošević
Best Documentary Robert Award winners
2000s English-language films